This article is about the list of counts who reigned over the county of Meaux.

about 750 : Helmgaud 

787 : Richard, appeared in an inventory of Abbey of Saint Wandrille after the death of abbot Witlaic

799-813 : Helmgaud II son of Gauzhelm, son of Helmgaud I; he was a Charlemagne's missi dominici alongside the bishop Jessé d'Amiens ; he notably attended the coronation of Charlemagne (according to Royal Frankish Annals in 799) and was sent in 802 as an embassy to Michael I Rangabe in about 812-813

862-877 : Louis the Stammerer († 879) king of France (877-879)

?-886 : Thibert (or Teutbert), count of Madrie, son or grandson of Nivelon, his daughter marries Pepin I of Aquitaine

886-888 : Thibert (Teutbert or Tetbert) († 888), killed in Rouen, brother of Anscharic bishop of Paris

888-902 : Herbert I of Vermandois († 902), count of Vermandois

902-943 : Herbert II de Vermandois († 943), count of Vermandois, son of the preceding, marries Adèle, daughter of Robert I of France, king of France

943-966 : Robert of Vermandois († 966), count of Meaux (943-967) and Troyes (956-967), son of the preceding
marries Adélaïde Werra, countess of Troyes, daughter of Gilbert de Chalon, main count of Burgundy

967-995 : Herbert of Vermandois, count of Meaux and Troyes, son of the preceding

995-1022 : Stephen I of Troyes, count of Meaux and Troyes, son of the preceding

1022-1037 : Odo II, Count of Blois (983 † 1037), count of Blois, of Reims, Meaux and Troyes, cousin of the preceding, descendant of Herbert II, count of Vermandois
marries firstly in 1103 to Mathilde de Normandie († 1006)
secondly to Ermengearde d'Auvergne

1037-1047 : Stephen II († 1047), count of Meaux and Troyes, son of the preceding and Ermengearde d'Auvergne

1047-1066 : Odo II of Troyes († 1115), count of Meaux and Troyes, son of the preceding
he accompanies William the Conqueror and settles in England. His uncle then took over his Champagne estates.

1066-1089 : Thibaut I (1019 † 1089), count of Blois, Meaux and Troyes, uncle of the preceding, son of Odo I and Ermengearde d'Auvergne
marries firstly to Gersende du Maine 
secondly to Adele of Valois

1089-1102 : Stephen, († 1102), count of Blois and Meaux, son of Theobald I and Gersende du Maine.
marries Adela of Normandy

1102-1151 : Theobald II, († 1152), count of Blois and Meaux, count of Champagne in 1125, son of the preceding.

See list of counts of Champagne next

Viscount of Meaux 
The counts of Meaux were assisted by the viscounts of Meaux, at least since 1081/1098  They were also Lords of La Ferté-Ancoul/-sous-Jouarre (see details in this article), and from the end of the 11th century until the Revolution, the viscounts were descended from the old masters of La Ferté-sous-Jouarre : the families of La Ferté-Ancoul, then Oisy (Simon), of Montmirail (Jean de Montmirail and his daughter Marie ; they had also Condé, long associated with La Ferté-Ancoul and Meaux), Coucy (Enguerrand III ; Enguerrand V), of Béthune-Locres, Bar (Robert of Marle and his daughter Jeanne), of Luxembourg-Saint-Pol (Louis and his granddaughter Marie), of Bourbon-Vendôme (Charles, duke of Vendôme and the grandfather of the King Henri IV) then Bourbon-Condé (Louis). 
And then 13 August 1627 Henri II of Condé (1588-1646 ; 26th Viscount of Meaux) yields the viscount (Word épicène at the time) to duke of Sully, Maximilien de Béthune, from Béthune-Locres (the valuation was very low  15 000 livres only, except of course if it concerns the income and not the capital of the viscount : cf. the pages Google and La fortune de Sully, p. 112, by Isabelle Aristide). The latter leaves it to his youngest son François, duke of Orval (1602-1678 ; brother of Maximilien II) and to his grandson Philippe († August 1682 ; son of François ; he is said to have ceded the viscount during his lifetime to his first cousin Maximilien III), then to Maximilien II, dukes of Sully Maximilien III François (1615-1662), Maximilien IV Pierre (1640-1694), Maximilien V Pierre-François-Nicolas (1664-1712) Maximilien VI Henri (1669-1729 ; without offspring : vacant at his death), Maximilien VIII Antoine-Armand of Orval (1730-1786 ; known as viscount of Meaux since his birth; father of Maximilien IX Alexis (1750-1776) and Maximilien X Gabriel-Louis (1756-1800)).

References 

Counts of Meaux
Meaux
Lists of French nobility